The Nakh languages are a group  of languages within Northeast Caucasian family, spoken chiefly by the Chechens and Ingush in the North Caucasus.

Bats is the endangered language of the Bats people, an ethnic minority in Georgia.
The Chechen, Ingush and Bats peoples are also grouped under the ethno-linguistic umbrella of Nakh peoples.

Classification
The Nakh languages were historically classified as an independent North-Central Caucasian family, but are now recognized as a branch of the Northeast Caucasian family. 

The separation of Nakh from common Northeast Caucasian has been tentatively dated to the Neolithic (ca. 4th millennium BC).

The Nakh language family consists of:
 Vainakh languages, a dialect continuum with two literary languages:
 Chechen – approximately 1,330,000 speakers (2002).
 Ingush – approximately 413,000 speakers (2002).
 Bats or Batsbi – approximately 3,420 (2000), spoken mostly in Zemo-Alvani, Georgia. Not mutually intelligible with Chechen or Ingush.

The voicing of ejective consonants
The Nakh languages are relevant to the glottalic theory of Indo-European, because the Vainakh branch has undergone the voicing of ejectives that has been postulated but widely derided as improbable in that family. In initial position, Bats ejectives correspond to Vainakh ejectives, but in non-initial position to Vainakh voiced consonants.

A similar change has taken place in some of the other Dagestanian languages.

Proposed connections to extinct languages 
Many obscure ancient languages or peoples have been postulated by scholars of the Caucasus as Nakh, many in the South Caucasus. None of these have been confirmed; most are classified as Nakh on the basis of placenames.

Èrsh
The Èrsh language, language of the Èrs who inhabited Northern Armenia, and then, (possibly) later, mainly Hereti in Southeast Georgia and Northwest Azerbaijan. This is considered to be more or less confirmed as Nakh. They were assimilated eventually, and their language was replaced by Georgian or Azeri.

Malkh
The language of the Malkhs (whose name, malkh, refers to the sun) in the North Caucasus, who lived in modern day Kabardino-Balkaria, Karachay–Cherkessia, and once briefly conquered Ubykhia and Abkhazia. They were conquered first by Scythian-speaking Alan tribes and then by Turkic tribes, and seem to have largely abandoned their homeland and found shelter among the Chechens, leading to the formation of a teip named after them. Those who stayed behind were either wiped out or assimilated.

Dval
The language of the Dvals is thought to be Nakh by many historians, though there is a rivaling camp arguing for its status as a close relative of Ossetic. Various backing for the Nakh theory (different scholars use different arguments) includes the presence of Nakh placenames in former Dval territory, evidence of Nakh–Svan contact which probably would've required the Nakh nature of the Dvals or people there before them, and the presence of a foreign-origin Dval clan among the Chechens, seemingly implying that the Dvals found shelter (like the Malkhs are known to have done) among the Chechens from the conquest of their land by foreign invaders (presumably Ossetes).

Tsov
According to Georgian scholars I. A. Javashvili and Giorgi Melikishvili, the Urartian state of Supani was occupied by the ancient Nakh tribe Tsov, whose state is called Tsobena in ancient Georgian historiography. The Tsov language was the dominant language spoken by its people, and was thought by these Georgian historians (as well as a number of others) to be Nakh. Tsov and its relatives in the area may have contributed to the Hurro-Urartian substratum in the Armenian language.

See also 
 Languages of the Caucasus
 Northeast Caucasian languages
 North Caucasian languages
 Alarodian languages

References

External links
Proto-Nakh (and Chechen, Ingush, Bats) basic lexicon at the Global Lexicostatistical Database

Northeast Caucasian languages
Languages of Russia